A dream car is a car which satisfies wish fulfillment.

The superlative "dream car" may be associated with:

 Supercar, a very fast performance car
 Luxury car, a very expensive car with luxurious fittings
 Show car, a custom display car
 Concept car, a car designed to display concepts, whose physical representation may be a prototype or a mockup

See also
 Dream (disambiguation)
 Car (disambiguation)
 People's Car (disambiguation)
 Decrepit car, the opposite of a dream car
 Dream Car Garage, Canadian TV series
 How It's Made: Dream Cars (TV series) a spinoff TV programme from the TV show How It's Made

 Car ownership
Automotive terminology